Pelican Creek is a former rural locality in the Barcaldine Region, Queensland, Australia.

On 22 November 2019 the Queensland Government decided to amalgamate the localities in the Barcaldine Region, resulting in five expanded localities based on the larger towns: Alpha, Aramac, Barcaldine, Jericho and Muttaburra. Pelican Creek was incorporated into Aramac.

Geography 
The Muttaburra Aramac Road forms the south-west boundary of the locality.

Pelican Creek (from which the locality presumably takes its name) flows from Lake Mueller in the north of the locality to the south-west of the locality where it becomes a tributary to Aramac Creek, which is in turn a tributary of the Thomson River and contributes to the Lake Eyre drainage basin.

The Aramac Range is within the east and south-east of the locality.

The principal land use is grazing on native vegetation.

Education 
There are no schools in Pelican Creek. The nearest primary school is in neighbouring Aramac. The nearest secondary schools are in Aramac (to Year 10 only) and Barcaldine (to Year 12).

References 

Barcaldine Region
Unbounded localities in Queensland